The Mosquito Coast is an American drama television series developed by Neil Cross and Tom Bissell based on the novel of the same name by Paul Theroux published in 1981. It is also loosely adapted from the 1986 film which starred Harrison Ford. The series stars Justin Theroux, nephew of Paul, and Melissa George in lead roles, with Logan Polish and Gabriel Bateman rounding out the main cast. Justin Theroux also serves as executive producer of the series, along with Rupert Wyatt who directed the first two episodes.

The first season consists of seven episodes and premiered on Apple TV+ on April 30, 2021, and concluded on June 4, 2021. In June 2021, the series was renewed for a second season consisting of ten episodes. The second season premiered on November 4, 2022 and concluded on January 6, 2023. In January 2023, the series was cancelled after two seasons.

Premise
An idealistic inventor, disgusted with the corruption of the industrial world, uproots his family to Latin America. When the U.S. government tries to catch them, they take a dangerous quest through Mexico to flee the U.S. government and find safety.

Cast

Main
Justin Theroux as Allie Fox, an idealistic family man and inventor growing increasingly disillusioned with commercialization in the United States.
Melissa George as Margot Fox, Allie's wife and a former university professor and environmentalist.
Logan Polish as Dina Fox, Allie and Margot's teenage daughter.
Billie Roy portrays a young Dina Fox (guest season 2).
Gabriel Bateman as Charlie Fox, Allie and Margot's young son.
Ian Hart as William "Bill" Lee (season 2; recurring season 1), a professional hitman who is hired by Lucrecia to hunt down Allie and is later hired by Guillermo to work as a fixer.
Ariyon Bakare as Richard Beaumont (season 2), an environmentalist, domestic terrorist and former lover of Margot who he tracks down with the hopes of fulfilling an unknown agenda.
Natalia Cordova-Buckley as Isela (season 2), the de facto leader of Casa Roja, a remote community of exiles and runaways in the rainforests of Guatemala, and an old friend of Allie.
Daniel Raymont as Guillermo Bautista (season 2), the drug lord of an influential Central American gang whose dying father owns the land Casa Roja is built on.

Recurring
Kimberly Elise as Estelle Jones (season 1), a mysterious government agent tracking Allie and his family.
James LeGros as Don Voorhees (season 1), an NSA agent and Jones' partner.
Scotty Tovar as Chuy Padilla (season 1), a coyote who helps smuggle Allie and his family across the Mexico–U.S. Border.
Ofelia Medina as Lucrecia Salazar (season 1), the vicious matriarch of a powerful Mexican drug cartel.
Matt McCoy as JJ Raban (season 2), a former high-ranking NSA agent whose career was ruined by Allie.
Mike Ostroski as Ridley (season 2), an experienced smuggler who brings supplies to Casa Roja.
Alejandro Akara as Adolfo (season 2), a young smuggler, Ridley's adopted son and Dina's love interest.
Reed Diamond as Carter Albrecht (season 2), the lead land developer of an urban development project who is working with Andrea to build on the lands where Casa Roja resides.
Cosima Cabrera as Andrea Bautista (season 2), Guillermo's younger sister, who hopes to sell their family's land to Carter.

Guest
Kevin Dunn as Margot's dad. (season 1)
Kate Burton as Margot's mother. (season 1)
Emily Chang as Officer V. Chu (season 1), a police officer who has had frequent run-ins with Allie.
Tommy Martinez as Juan (season 1), Chuy's friend and a coyote in Arizona.
Bruno Bichir as Enrique Salazar (season 1), the owner of a private estate across the border that serves as a front for a drug cartel.
Luis de La Rosa as Hugo (season 1), Enrique's young son.
Alexandre Bar as Patrice (season 1), a French backpacker who befriends Charlie.
Nicole Rainteau as Tessa (season 1), a British backpacker traveling with Patrice.
Paterson Joseph as "Calaca" (season 1), the gatekeeper to Casa Roja, a sanctuary for fugitives fleeing from the U.S. government.
Terry Serpico as Hershey (season 1), a boat salesman in Pichilinque.
Gustavo Sánchez Parra as Lieutenant A. Flores (season 1), the head of the Pichilinque police department.
Ritu Lal as Pavani (season 2), Allie's former business partner.
Will Price as Caleb (season 2), an MIT graduate and computer hacker hired by Guillermo.

Episodes

Series overview

Season 1 (2021)

Season 2 (2022-23)

Production

Development
The series was formally given a green light September 16, 2019, with Neil Cross as the show runner and Rupert Wyatt directing the first two episodes and executive producing the series. Cross and Tom Bissell wrote the first episode. On June 2, 2021, Apple TV+ renewed the series for a second season. The series was canceled after two seasons on January 20, 2023.

Casting
Along with the announcement, Justin Theroux (a nephew of Paul Theroux) was said to star as the main character. On November 4, 2019, it was announced that Melissa George, Gabriel Bateman, and Logan Polish joined the series starring as Theroux's family members in the series. Kimberly Elise joined the project on November 19, 2019. For the second season, Natalia Cordova-Buckley, Ian Hart, and Ariyon Bakare were announced as series regulars on February 16, 2022.

Filming
Filming for the series began in November 2019 in Los Angeles. Production then shifted to Mexico City only to be canceled due to the COVID-19 pandemic. The series resumed filming October to December in Guadalajara, Zapopan, and Puerto Vallarta. In mid-December, the series filmed in the Riviera Nayarit. On February 1, 2021, in an interview with his cousin Louis Theroux, Justin Theroux revealed he was filming in Guadalajara.

Release
The series premiered on Apple TV+ with its first two episodes on April 30, 2021. The first season consisted of a total of seven episodes, releasing weekly until June 4, 2021. On June 3, 2021, the series was renewed for a second season.

Reception
On review aggregator Rotten Tomatoes, The Mosquito Coast holds an approval rating of 63% based on 46 reviews, with an average rating of 6.36/10. The website's critics consensus reads, "The Mosquito Coast has suspense to spare, but by burying the best parts of its source material in too many twists it fails to turn into a satisfying series." On Metacritic, which uses a weighted average, the series has a score of 55 out of 100 based on 22 reviews, indicating "mixed or average reviews".

Nick Allen of RogerEbert.com gave the series a negative review, writing that "the series is far less radical than it posits—especially with plotting that turns a blind eye to the family's inherent advantages—and the tone-deaf tourism of The Mosquito Coast makes for an adventure that's increasingly difficult to go along with."

In a 2023 interview with Deadline Hollywood, the original novel's author Paul Theroux, hoping for a third season that would segue into the events of his novel, praised the series, stating that he was "fascinated" by what the filmmakers had made of his work: "I'm an exec[utive] producer so I was tuned into each episode, but I was still on the edge of my seat wondering what was going to happen. They've done such a great job writing and directing, and the acting is terrific." He also highlighted the beneficial expansion of his story by giving Allie Fox a "plausible backstory", and especially by fleshing out Margot Fox as a "complete" and "believable" character with "reason and accountability".

References

External links 
 
 

Apple TV+ original programming
2021 American television series debuts
2023 American television series endings
2020s American drama television series
English-language television shows
Television series by Fremantle (company)
Television productions suspended due to the COVID-19 pandemic
Television shows based on American novels
Paul Theroux
Television shows filmed in Mexico
Works by Neil Cross
Works about Mexican drug cartels